Poro, officially the Municipality of Poro,  is a 4th class municipality in the province of Cebu, Philippines. According to the 2020 census, it has a population of 26,232 people.

Poro, along with the municipality of Tudela, is located on Poro Island of the Camotes Islands.

Poro is bordered to the north by the Province of Leyte in the Camotes Sea, to the west is by the island of Pacijan Island With the town of San Francisco, to the east is the town of Tudela and to the south is the Camotes Sea

The patronal feast of Poro is celebrated on the third Friday of January, in honour of the Santo Niño de Cebu.

Geography

Barangays
Poro comprises 17 barangays:

Climate

Demographics

Etymology and languages

The town's name is derived from the Waray-Waray word puro meaning "island". This how Camotes Island is called by Warays and Leyteños. Before the first municipality to be established in Camotes, puro meant the name of all the islands.

Aside from Cebuano, Waray, Tagalog, and English, the townsfolk also speak the local Porohanon language. Also known as Camotes Visayan, the language is mutually intelligible with other Visayan languages (e.g. Cebuano) spoken in the rest of the Camotes Islands, Cebu, other parts of the Visayas, and Northern Mindanao.

The town is home to the Porohanon language, one of the most endangered languages in the Visayas. The language is only used in the Poro islands. The language is classified as distinct from Cebuano by the Komisyon ng Wikang Filipino and is vital to the culture and arts of the Porohanon people.  Porohanon is distinguished by the way the locals substitute // sounds with //, for instance Cebuano maayong buntag ("good morning") vocalised as maazong buntag in Porohanon. (Possibly occasions too a handover from the yeísmo phenomenon in Spanish.) Other dialectical variations include the Porohanon ara dira instead of the standard Cebuano na-a diha.

Economy

References

Further reading

External links
 [ Philippine Standard Geographic Code]

Municipalities of Cebu